Indian Point may refer to:

Places
 Indian Point, Missouri, a village in Stone County, Missouri, United States
 Indian Point, Nova Scotia, Canada
 Indian Point, Bay d'Espoir, Newfoundland and Labrador, Canada
 Indian Point, a National Historic Site of Canada on Red Indian Lake, Newfoundland and Labrador, Canada
 Indianola, Texas, a ghost town in the United States; called Indian Point before 1849
 Cape Chaplino, a cape on the Bering Sea coast of Siberia sometimes referred to historically as "Indian Point"

Other uses
 Indian Point Energy Center, a nuclear power plant in New York, United States